Orgyen Lingpa (o rgyan gling pa), (1323 –  1360) was one of the greatest Tibetan tertöns or treasure-finders of the 14th century.

Orgyen Lingpa discovered the important terma Pema Katang (The Life and Liberation of Padmasambhava) and many other important texts in the west-facing Pema Shelpuk cave near the entrance of the Yarlung Valley.

Footnotes

References
 Dorje, Gyurme (1999). Footprint Tibet Handbook with Bhutan. Footprint Handbooks, Bath, England. .
 Dowman, Keith. (1988) The Power-Places of Central Tibet: The Pilgrim's Guide. Routledge & Kegan Paul, London & New York. .
 Dudjom Rinpoche (Jikdrel Yeshe Dorje) (1991). The Nyingmapa School of Tibetan Buddhism: Its Fundamentals and History. 2 Vols. Translated and edited by Gyurme Dorje with Matthew Kapstein. Wisdom Publications. Boston. .

1323 births
1360s deaths
14th-century Tibetan people
History of Tibet
Politics of Tibet
Tertöns
Tibetan Buddhist yogis